Matthew Christopher Howard (born September 22, 1967 in Fall River, Massachusetts) is a retired Major League Baseball second baseman. He played during one season at the major league level for the New York Yankees. 

Howard attended Pepperdine University. In 1988 he played collegiate summer baseball with the Orleans Cardinals of the Cape Cod Baseball League and was named a league all-star. He was selected by the Los Angeles Dodgers in the 34th round of the 1989 MLB Draft. 

References

External links

1967 births
Living people
Major League Baseball second basemen
New York Yankees players
Baseball players from Massachusetts
Great Falls Dodgers players
Bakersfield Dodgers players
Vero Beach Dodgers players
Albuquerque Dukes players
San Antonio Missions players
Bowie Baysox players
Columbus Clippers players
Fresno Grizzlies players
Nashville Sounds players
Sportspeople from Fall River, Massachusetts
Pepperdine Waves baseball players
Orleans Firebirds players